Cegelnica is a settlement in the Municipality of Naklo in the Upper Carniola region of Slovenia.

References

External links 

Cegelnica on Geopedia

Populated places in the Municipality of Naklo